New St. Joseph Cemetery is a Catholic cemetery located at West Eighth Street and Nebraska Avenue in Cincinnati, Ohio in the Price Hill neighborhood. The original Old St. Joseph's Cemetery was founded at West Eight Street & Enright Avenue, in 1843 by Rev. John Baptist Purcell, for English speaking Catholics. The new cemetery was created in 1853 following the cholera outbreak which began in 1849, as the Irish section of St. Joseph Cemetery had reached its capacity, the new cemetery was located two miles (3 km) west. The Old St. Joseph's Cemetery, was used mostly by German Catholics.

Originally New St. Joseph's land plot was sixty-one acres, but today the cemetery grounds encompass one-hundred and sixty-three acres, which was once part of the Terry family farm. The grounds are maintained by the St. Joseph Cemetery Association.

List of notable inurnments
 Walter Connolly (1887–1940) – American character actor
 William Henry Elder (1819–1904) – Roman Catholic Bishop of Cincinnati
 Henry K. Moeller (1849–1925) – Roman Catholic Bishop of Cincinnati

References

External links
 St. Joseph's New Cemetery
 
 
 

Cemeteries in Cincinnati
Roman Catholic cemeteries in Ohio
Roman Catholic Archdiocese of Cincinnati